A centimetre (international spelling) or centimeter (American spelling) (SI symbol cm) is a unit of length in the International System of Units (SI), equal to one hundredth of a metre, centi being the SI prefix for a factor of . Equivalently, there are 100 centimetres in 1 metre. The centimetre was the base unit of length in the now deprecated centimetre–gram–second (CGS) system of units.

Though for many physical quantities, SI prefixes for factors of 103—like milli- and kilo-—are often preferred by technicians, the centimetre remains a practical unit of length for many everyday measurements. A centimetre is approximately the width of the fingernail of an average adult person.

Equivalence to other units of length

{|
|-
|rowspan=4 valign=top|1 centimetre
|= 10 millimetres
|-
|= 0.01 metres
|-
|= 0.393700787401574803149606299212598425196850 inches
|-
|  (There are exactly 2.54 centimetres in one inch.)
|}

One millilitre is defined as one cubic centimetre, under the SI system of units.

Other uses
In addition to its use in the measurement of length, the centimetre is used:
 sometimes, to report the level of rainfall as measured by a rain gauge
 in the CGS system, the centimetre is used to measure capacitance, where 1 cm of capacitance =  farads
 in  maps, centimetres are used to make conversions from map scale to real world scale (kilometres)
 to represent second moment of areas (cm4)
 as the inverse of the Kayser, a CGS unit, and thus a non-SI metric unit of wavenumber:  1 kayser = 1 wave per centimetre; or, more generally, (wavenumber in kaysers) = 1/(wavelength in centimetres). The SI unit of wavenumber is the inverse metre, m−1.

Unicode symbols
For the purposes of compatibility with Chinese, Japanese and Korean (CJK) characters, Unicode has symbols for:
 centimetre – 
 square centimetre – 
 cubic centimetre – 

They are mostly used only with East Asian fixed-width CJK fonts, because they are equal in size to one Chinese character.

See also
Conversion of units
Orders of magnitude (length)
Reciprocal length

References

Metre
-02
Centimetre–gram–second system of units
SI units
100 (number)